David Carter "Davey" Hearn (born April 17, 1959 in Bethesda, Maryland) is a former slalom canoeist who competed from the late 1970s to the early 2000s (decade). He won seven medals in the C1 event at the ICF Canoe Slalom World Championships with two golds (1985, 1995) and five silvers (1979, 1981, 1983, 1987, 1989). He also won six consecutive world championship gold medals in the C1 team event (1979-1989).

Hearn competed in three Summer Olympics, earning his best finish of ninth in the C1 event in Atlanta in 1996.

Hearn's sister, Cathy, and his ex-brother-in-law, Lecky Haller, also competed in canoe slalom for the United States.

World Cup individual podiums

References

1959 births
American male canoeists
Canoeists at the 1992 Summer Olympics
Canoeists at the 1996 Summer Olympics
Canoeists at the 2000 Summer Olympics
Living people
Olympic canoeists of the United States
People from Bethesda, Maryland
International whitewater paddlers
Medalists at the ICF Canoe Slalom World Championships